The Iveco Metro is a low-entry single-decker bus chassis manufactured by Iveco Bus in Dandenong, Victoria for the Australian market.

It has been purchased by a number of Australian operators including Carbridge, Coastal Liner, Green's Northern Coaches, Grenda's Bus Service, Ivanhoe Bus Company, Moonee Valley Coaches, Red Bus Services, State Transit, Telford's Bus & Coach, Torrens Transit and Transdev Shorelink.

References

External links

Bus Australia gallery

Bus chassis
Buses of France
Metro
Low-floor buses
Full-size buses
Vehicles introduced in 2005